Boudewijn is a Dutch masculine given name, equivalent to Baldwin. People with the name include:

People with the given name 
 Boudewijn of Belgium (1930–1993), King of the Belgians 1951–1993
 Boudewijn Binkhorst (born 1942), Dutch sailor
 Boudewijn Vincent Bonebakker (born 1968), Dutch musician
 Boudewijn Karel Boom (1903–1980), Dutch botanist and author
 Boudewijn Bouckaert (born 1947), Belgian political theorist
 Boudewijn Büch (1948–2002), Dutch writer and television producer
 Boudewijn Buckinx (born 1945), Belgian composer
 Boudewijn Castelijn, Dutch field hockey coach
 Boudewijn Catz (ca. 1601–1663), Dutch priest
 Boudewijn de Geer (born 1955), Dutch footballer
 Boudewijn de Groot (born 1944), Dutch singer-songwriter
 Boudewijn Hendricksz (died 1626), Dutch corsair and admiral
 Boudewijn van Offenberg (1590–1653), Dutch notary and merchant
 Boudewijn Poelmann (born 1949), Dutch entrepreneur
 Boudewijn Röell (born 1989), Dutch rower
 Boudewijn Sirks (born 1947), Dutch specialist on Roman Law
 Boudewijn Zenden (born 1976), Dutch footballer

See also 

 Boudewijn Seapark, Belgian amusement park
 Baudouin (disambiguation)

References 

Dutch masculine given names